Phyllocaulis is a genus of land slugs, shell-less terrestrial pulmonate gastropod mollusks in the family Veronicellidae, the leatherleaf slugs. This is a South American genus.

Species

Species within the genus Phyllocaulis include:
 Phyllocaulis boraceiensis
 Phyllocaulis gayi
 Phyllocaulis renschi
 Phyllocaulis soleiformis
 Phyllocaulis tuberculosus
 Phyllocaulis variegatus

References 

 Gomes, S.R., Britto da Silva, F., Mendes, I.L., Thomé, J.W., Bonatto, S.L., 2010. Molecular phylogeny of the South American land slug Phyllocaulis (Mollusca, Soleolifera, Veronicellidae). - Zoologica Scripta 39: 177-186.

Veronicellidae